The Malaysian Maritime Enforcement Agency (Abbr.; MMEA;  – APMM); formally known as Malaysia Coast Guard for international identification, is the coast guard organisation of Malaysia, and principal government agency tasked with maintaining law and order, and coordinating search and rescue operations in the Malaysian Maritime Zone and on the high seas.

The Agency and its members are part of the Malaysian Federal Civil Agency and report directly to the Ministry of Home Affairs. The MMEA however, can be integrated under Malaysian Armed Forces command during an emergency, special crisis, or wartime.

The agency maintains close ties with the United States Coast Guard (USCG) and Japan Coast Guard (JCG).

History

The history of the Malaysian Maritime Enforcement Agency (MMEA) began with the report on the 'Feasibility Study on the Establishment of Malaysian Coastguard' conducted by National Security Council, Prime Minister's Department on 21 April 1999.

The findings of the report agreed to by the Cabinet of Malaysia and on 16 April 2003, a Nucleus Team led by Datuk Abu Talib Haji Harun, was created with the objective of organising the creation of the Agency. The Agency was formally established with the enactment of the Malaysian Maritime Enforcement Agency Act 2004 (Act 633) by the Malaysian Parliament in May 2004. Subsequently, the Act received the Royal Assent from the Yang Di Pertuan Agong on 25 June 2004 and was gazetted on 1 July of the same year. On 15 February 2005, the Act came into force.

The Agency is introduced to the public on 10 October 2005 by then Deputy Prime Minister, Dato' Seri Najib Razak and achieved operational status on 30 November 2005 with the commencement of patrols by MMEA vessels.

On 21 March 2006, MMEA is officially launched as a part of a Malaysian government agency by the Deputy Prime Minister.

Rebrand as Malaysia Coast Guard 

On 28 April 2017, the MMEA is formally rebranded to the 'Malaysia Coast Guard' for international identification. New vessels being delivered to the service, including the New Generation Patrol Craft (NGPC) will feature this new name on their respective liveries. However the name 'Malaysian Maritime Enforcement Agency' will be retained in the meantime for working purposes.

Reassigned to the Ministry of Home Affairs 
In May 2018, under the Malaysian new government, MMEA was planned to be consolidated to the Ministry of Home Affairs. In November 2018, under Malaysia's Budget 2019, the decision was finalised.

Function and responsibility 

 Enforce law and order under any federal law in the Malaysian Maritime Zone
 Performing maritime search and rescue tasks in the Malaysian Maritime Zone and in the high seas
 Prevent and suppress the commission of offences in the Malaysian Maritime Zone
 Providing assistance in any criminal matter at the request of foreign nations as provided under 'Mutual Assistance Act in Criminal Matters 2002' (Act 621)
 Conduct air and coast monitoring
 Establish and manage maritime institutions for Agency's officer training
 To perform any duty to ensure maritime prosperity and security or to do all things incidental thereto
 At high seas:
 Perform maritime search and rescue tasks
 Control and prevent maritime pollution in the high seas
 Prevent and suppress piracy
 prevent and suppress the illegal distribution of narcotic drugs
 During a state of emergency, special crisis, or war, this agency or any part of the agency is put under the control of the General Command of the Malaysian Armed Forces

Malaysian maritime zone

Internal waters and territorial sea
 Territorial Sea: 12 nautical miles (22 km) from baseline
 Sovereignty: part of the territory of Malaysia.
 Subject to the right of innocent passage for all vessels

Contiguous zone
 24 nautical miles (44 km) from coast.
 Jurisdiction to prevent or punish infringement of customs, fiscal, immigration or sanitary laws.

Exclusive economic zone (EEZ)
 200 nautical miles (370 km) from coast.
 Sovereign rights over the management of the resources of the seabed and water column.
 Jurisdiction in respect of: - construction of artificial islands- marine scientific research - protection and preservation of the marine environment.
 Subject to the rights of other States including: freedoms of navigation, overflight, and laying of submarine cables.

Continental shelf
  or to the extent of the continental margin.
 Sovereign rights over the management of the resources of the seabed but not the water column.
 Jurisdiction in respect of: -construction of artificial islands - drilling on the continental shelf.
 Subject to the rights of other States including freedoms of navigation, overflight, laying of submarine cables and revenue sharing.

Organisation

Director General of Malaysian Maritime Enforcement Agency

A Director General of Malaysian Maritime Enforcement Agency appointed by the Yang Di Pertuan Agong (King) on the advice of the prime minister under Section 4(1) of the Act is responsible for the operational direction, command, control and supervision of the Agency. Administratively, the Director General reports directly to the Chief Secretary to the Government. By virtue of his office, he is also the head of the Malaysian Maritime Enforcement Service. The Director General is assisted by three Deputy Directors General, each responsible for Management, Operations and Logistics. The post is an open one enabling any civil, military or police officer to be appointed to the post. For the purposes of discipline, the Director General is considered to be a member of the general public service of the Federation under Section 4(4).

Officers and other ranks
The officers and other ranks of the MMEA are appointed by the Public Service Commission as Maritime Enforcement Service officers under Section 5(1) of the Act and are considered civil servants under the Malaysian Civil Service. The Agency also consists of officers and staff from various other Services such as the Administrative and Diplomatic Service, Judicial and Legal Service, Information System Service and others. This personnel are primarily involved in matters of administration, finance, procurement, human resource management, legal affairs and prosecution, and information technology.

Ranks
Ranks for officers and other ranks in the Agency are derived from the Royal Malaysian Navy. Officer and Warrant Officer insignia are similar to that of their naval counterparts. Chevrons are used to denote the ranks of Chief Petty Officer and below.

Headquarters
The headquarters of the Agency is situated at One IOI Square, IOI Resort, Putrajaya, close to the federal administrative centre of Malaysia. The Agency HQ was formerly based in Cyberjaya before it shifted to the present address in April 2006.

Academy

The Akademi Maritim Sultan Ahmad Shah (AMSAS) or Malaysian Maritime Enforcement Agency Academy is a coast guard academy. It is located at Gebeng near Kuantan, Pahang.

Operational areas
The operational area of the Agency is the Malaysian Maritime Zone which is divided into 5 Maritime Regions consisting of 18 Maritime Districts.

Special forces

The MMEA currently have its own elite special force unit called the STAR (Special Task and Rescue). It is composed of members from the Royal Malaysian Air Force's (RMAF) PASKAU and Royal Malaysian Navy's (RMN) PASKAL. Their task is to perform hostage rescue operations in shallow waters that are under MMEA's jurisdiction. They are also tasked to do counter-terrorism missions in Malaysian waters alongside the RMN. The STAR is considerably well trained as its members are taken from RMAF and the RMN special forces units.

On 2 July 2009, the first batch of fresh commando units graduated from Basic Commando Selection alongside the Royal Malaysian Air Force PASKAU. They were given American-styled ACUs (Army Combat Uniform), maya blue PASKAU's berets and also the Malaysian Army zebra woodland camouflage uniform.

List of chief maritime
1. Laksamana Maritim Dato’ Mohamad bin Nik (30 November 2005 – 14 March 2008)

2. Laksamana Maritim Datuk Mohd Amdan bin Kurish (5 May 2008 – 9 September 2015)

3. Laksamana Maritim Datuk Ahmad Puzi Ab Kahar (9 September 2015 – 27 May 2017)

4. Laksamana Maritim Datuk Zulkifili Abu Bakar (1 June 2017 – 5 August 2019)

5. Laksamana Maritim Datuk Mohd Zubil Mat Som (19 August 2019 – 16 March 2023)

6.Laksamana Maritim Saiful Lizan Ibrahim (acting, 17 March 2023)

Equipment

Present development
In 2015, Malaysia signed a contract worth RM380 million (US$96.8 million) to order six-ship known as the Bagan Datuk-class patrol vessel. The ship was design based on German-based Fassmer Shipbuilding Company. The first ship is expected to be delivered by December 2016 while the last ship is expected to be delivered by June 2018. The ship will also be equipped with Spanish-Aerovision Fulmar UAVs.
In September 2016, the Japanese government through its Prime Minister Shinzō Abe have promise to give Malaysia patrol vessels that will be sent in the first half of 2017 following similar agreements with the Philippines and Vietnam. The military vessels, which previously used by the Japan Coast Guard will be handed over free of charge to Malaysia to counter Chinese military activities in the waters of Malaysia. Three new Tun Fatimah-class offshore patrol vessel also ordered by Malaysia in 2017 to boost up patrol capabilities.
In February 2020, The Home Ministry has approved the procurement of four helicopters worth RM600 million for the Malaysian Maritime Enforcement Agency (MMEA).

In popular culture
In film
Coast Guard The Movie: Operasi Helang or Operation Eagle a 2023 action film starring Saharul Ridzwan, Adlin Aman Ramlie tells the story an officer Special Task and Rescue against a maritime militants in island and save his family.

On television

The MMEA has been featured a few series including:
TQ Captain (2018), Hisyam Hamid portrays Lieutenant Adam Alahudin, a commanding officer boat patrol MMEA who aired in Astro Ria.
999 (Malaysian TV series) various case related to MMEA since 2006.
Malaysia Hari Ini, TV3.
Majalah 3, TV3.
Selamat Pagi Malaysia, RTM.

See also
Malaysian Armed Forces
Malaysian Army
Royal Malaysian Navy
Royal Malaysian Air Force
Royal Malaysia Police
Royal Johor Military Force
Joint Forces Command

References

https://mediavariasi.com/2023/01/coast-guard-malaysia-ops-helang-tonjol-budaya-sebenar-apmm/
https://www.nst.com.my/lifestyle/groove/2023/01/871184/showbiz-actor-saharul-ridzwan-beats-fear-deep-sea-spending-hour
https://www.rollodepelicula.com/2019/07/pelancaran-filem-coast-guard.html
https://gempak.com/berita-terkini/macam-tak-nak-bagi-tuan-adam-bersara-je-hisyam-hamid-terima-penghargaan-dari-maritim-malaysia-32740

External links

 Malaysian Maritime Enforcement Agency Website

 
Federal ministries, departments and agencies of Malaysia
Prime Minister's Department (Malaysia)
Coast guards
Gendarmerie
Sea rescue organizations
Law enforcement in Malaysia
2004 establishments in Malaysia
Government agencies established in 2004
Maritime law enforcement agencies